Godinlabe District is a district in the Galgaduud region of Galmudug state of Somalia. Its capital lies at Godinlabe.

References

Populated places in Galguduud
Galmudug